Ghabiden Mustafin (Ğabiden Mūstafin), previously until 2002 Tokarevka, is a town in Karaganda Region, Kazakhstan, with a population of 3,997.

Willi Kronhardt is a German football manager and former player born 17 February 1969 in Tokarevka.

References 

Populated places in Karaganda Region